Engels is the name of several inhabited localities in Russia.

Urban localities
Engels, Saratov Oblast, a city in Saratov Oblast; administratively incorporated as a city of oblast significance
 Engels-2 (air base), a nearby Russian Air Force base

Rural localities
Engels, Orenburg Oblast, a settlement in Marksovsky Selsoviet of Alexandrovsky District of Orenburg Oblast